Tomaso is a given name, being the Italian form of the name Thomas. Notable people with the name include:

 Variant of name Tommaso
 Tomaso Albinoni, 18th-century Italian composer
 Rico Tomaso, American illustrator and painter
 De Tomaso, Italian car-manufacturing company
 Alejandro de Tomaso, racing driver and businessman from Argentina